The Tutaekuri River flows through the Hawke's Bay Region of the eastern North Island of New Zealand. It flows east from the Kaweka Range, reaching the Pacific Ocean just to the south of Napier and Taradale, where the Ngaruroro and Clive Rivers join it.
Starting roughly 50 kilometers north east of Taihape, the Tutaekuri River flows for a distance of 99.9 kilometers.

History
Ngāti Pārau, which is the local hapū (sub-tribe) are said to have disposed of their waste food in this river. Tribes such as Ngāti Pāhauwera travelled to this river to share food and trade.

According to Ngāti Te Whatuiāpiti tradition, the river received the name Tūtaekurī, which means "dog-excrement" in commemoration of a feast in the late seventeenth century, when Kaitahi was travelling from Pōrangahau to Oeroa with people from Ngāti Kahungunu and his cousin Te Hikawera found the travellers en route, eating kōuka (shoots of the Tī kōuka). Hikawera invited them to Te Umukuri and feasted them on eels, freshwater mussels, and dogs. The innards of the dogs were disposed of in the traditional manner in the nearby river, which therefore gained its name. In thanks for his hospitality, the guests gave Te Hikawera Te Rangimokai as a wife. One of their sons, Te Kereru, was an the ancestor of Ngāti Pārau.

Redirection
Up until 1931, the lowest part of the Tutaekuri River flowed north, following its original channel (the location of present-day Taradale) and into Ahuriri Harbour. In the 1931 Hawke's Bay earthquake, the land underneath Ahuriri Harbour was drastically raised. The river was forced to seek an alternative route and started to back up, and so the residents of Hawke's Bay dug out a new, alternate path connecting it to the Ngaruroro River, into which it still flows today.

References

Rivers of the Hawke's Bay Region
Rivers of New Zealand